Chaturmukha Basadi is a symmetrical Jain temple located in Gerusoppa in Honnavar Taluk of Uttara Kannada district in the Indian state of Karnataka. The temple is situated near the banks of the Sharavati.

History 
The territory of Gerusoppa was a Jain capital during 1409–1610 CE ruled by the Saluva dynasty of the Vijayanagara Empire. It is said that 1,084 temples existed in the region, but were destroyed and presently only six remain. In 1865, the veranda roof, the spire and the floor slabs were carted away by tehsildars from Honnavar for construction of another temple. There is an inscription dated from the 16th century that mentions Rani Chennabhairadevi's (popularly called the "Pepper Queen") ascension to power. The chaturmukha temple was constructed in 1562 CE during the reign of Chennabhairadevi.

Gerusoppa also received royal patronage from the Hoysala Empire.

Architecture 

Chaturmukha Basadi is a famous Jain center located in the Gerusoppa. The temple is cross-shaped chaturmukha structure built in the Western Chalukya architectural style. The temple contains a central shrine, which has four entrances, and enshrines a life-size chaturmukha idol of Jina, Rishabhanatha, Ajitanatha, Sambhavanatha and Abhinandananatha, facing the four cardinal directions. Each hall of the temple is supported by four pillars with square bases and overhanging brackets with carvings of lotuses. There are ornate idols of Dvarapala, wearing a high crown and each holding a club and a cobra, on either side of the temple entrance.

There are idols of Tirthankara in the lotus position on three doorways and an image of Gajalakshmi on the fourth. There is a shrine to of Jwalamalini inside the temple. The temple also enshrines images of Virabhadra and Ganesha.

Other Jain Temples in Gerusoppa 
There are four other Jain temples in Gerusoppa.
 Mahavira temple houses a black stone idol of Mahavira, the 24th Tirthankara. The temple also houses three stone slab inscriptions — (1)  slab inscription, dated 1378 CE, with Jina at top with two worshippers, a cow and a calf. (2)  slab inscription has three sections; the first line has an image of Jina with an attendant, the second line has two male worshippers in the lotus position and third has two female worshippers on either side. (3)  slab inscription with a Jina inside temple adorned by devotees.
 Neminatha temple, situated near Mahavira temple, enshrines a large idol of Neminatha, the 22nd Tirthankara, seated on a circular pedestal.
 Parshvanatha temple is dedicated to Parshvanatha, the 23rd Tirthankara. The temple enshrines many idols collected from nearby shrines including a Pañcadhātu idol. There are images of twelve Tirthankaras in the panel of the temple.
 Kade temple enshrines a carved idol  of Parshvanatha with the hood of a cobra.

See also 
 Mirjan Fort
 Hadavalli
 Karkala

Notes

References

Citations

Sources

Books

Web

External links

Jain temples in Karnataka
16th-century Jain temples